Twilight (stylized as twilight) is a 2005 young adult vampire-romance novel by author Stephenie Meyer. It is the first book in the Twilight series, and introduces seventeen-year-old Isabella "Bella" Swan, who moves from Phoenix, Arizona to Forks, Washington. She is endangered after falling in love with Edward Cullen, a 103-year-old vampire frozen in his 17-year-old body. Additional novels in the series are New Moon, Eclipse, and Breaking Dawn.

Twilight received lukewarm reviews. Some praised the novel's tone and its portrayal of common teenage emotions such as alienation and rebellion. Others criticized Meyer's prose and argued the story was lacking in character development. It reached number five on the New York Times bestseller list within a month of its release and eventually reached first place. The novel was named one of Publishers Weekly's Best Children's Books of 2005.

The film adaptation, released in 2008, was a commercial success, grossing more than $392 million worldwide and making an additional $157 million in North American DVD sales as of July 2009. The book was the biggest-selling of 2008; in 2009, it was the second-biggest selling, losing only to its sequel New Moon.
As of 2008, Twilight had been translated into 37 different languages.

In October 2015, Stephenie Meyer announced a new gender-swapped version of the novel, entitled Life and Death: Twilight Reimagined, with characters Beau and Edythe, in honor of the 10th anniversary of The Twilight Saga. In 2020, Meyer released Midnight Sun, a retelling of the story of Twilight from the perspective of Edward Cullen.

Plot

Plot summary
Bella Swan is a seventeen-year-old introvert girl who moved from Phoenix, Arizona to Forks, Washington on the Olympic Peninsula to live with her father, Charlie Swan, the town's police chief. Her mother, Renée Dwyer, is traveling with her new husband, Phil Dwyer, a minor-league baseball player. Bella is admitted to Forks High School, where she easily settles in with a group of friends. A somewhat inexperienced and shy girl, Bella is dismayed by several boys competing for her attention.

On the first day of her school, Bella sits next to Edward in biology class, but he seems to be utterly repulsed by her, much to her bewilderment. He disappears for a few days but when he returns, he is unexpectedly friendly to Bella. Their newfound relationship is interrupted after Bella is nearly struck by a van in the school parking lot. Edward saves Bella, narrowly stopping the van with his bare hands. Bella questions Edward about how he saved her life but he refuses to tell her anything.

During a campout, Bella meets Jacob Black, a local boy from the Quileute tribe. She learns from stories told at a bonfire with his tribe that Edward and his family are "the cold ones" (vampires) who consume only animal blood. Disturbed and riddled by recurring nightmares, Bella researches vampires. She compares the characteristics of the vampires in mythology to the Cullens and becomes convinced that Edward is a vampire.
Bella is saved by Edward again in Port Angeles when she is almost attacked by a group of men. Furious, Edward drives Bella away and takes her to a restaurant for dinner and then back home. On the way, she tells him she knows that he is a vampire. Edward confirms her belief and confesses that Bella's blood is more desirable to him than anyone else's and he wanted to kill her on the first day of school. He tries to stay away from Bella to avoid hurting her, but over time, Edward and Bella fall in love.

Their relationship is affected when a nomad vampire coven arrives in Forks. James, a tracker vampire, who is intrigued by Cullen's relationship with a human, wants to hunt Bella for sport. Bella and Edward are forced to separate as Bella escapes with Alice and Jasper (Edward's brother and sister) to hide in a hotel in Phoenix.

James calls Bella and claims to be holding her mother hostage. Bella sneaks out and hurries to save her mother. When she arrives, she finds that the hostage claim was a ruse. James attacks her, but before he can kill her, she is rescued by Edward and the other Cullens who kill James. However, James has already bitten Bella. Edward prevents Bella from becoming a vampire by sucking the venom out of her wound, and she is treated at a hospital, using the story that she fell out of a window as an excuse.

After they return to Forks, Edward takes her to the school prom, as Edward did not want Bella to miss any normal human experience because of him. Bella says that she wants to become like him, a vampire, but Edward reiterates he is against this.

Bella's desire to become a vampire increases throughout the series. Edward continues to refuse to turn her, as he thinks being a vampire is being a monster, and does not want Bella to suffer the same fate.

Main characters
 Isabella "Bella" Swan - A 17-year-old girl who moves from Phoenix, Arizona to Forks, Washington to live with her father. Her mother moves to Florida with her second husband. Bella has a kind and awkward personality that is more mature than most girls her age. She is intelligent and observant, noticing and formulating theories about the Cullens' strange behaviors, physical features, and unusual abilities. Bella acts selfless by prioritizing the safety of her peers over herself. As the novel progresses, Bella unconsciously learns how to make difficult choices and accept their consequences. She enjoys reading traditional books of literature such as Romeo and Juliet and Wuthering Heights.
 Charlie Swan - Bella Swan's father who lives in Forks, Washington. He works as the head of police for the town. His parenting style can be described as authoritative. Charlie sets rules and expectations for Bella, but he allows some flexibility.
 Edward Cullen - A 103-year-old vampire who was transformed by Carlisle Cullen when he was near death with Spanish flu in 1918. He has a supernatural gift for reading people's minds. However, he cannot read Bella's thoughts. Since Edward's transformation into a vampire, he had never fallen in love nor believed that he needed to. He later realizes that his existence was completely pointless and without an aim. However, the day he meets Bella, his life changes. In Bella, he finds compassion, love, acceptance, and care. In Twilight, Edward has a pessimistic personality influenced by Meyer's naturally pessimistic character. Additionally, Edwards acts very protective of Bella because he believes Bella is "a magnet for trouble". His character was also influenced by Mr. Rochester from Jane Eyre. 
 Alice Cullen - A member of the Cullen vampire clan who remembers little about her human existence. Similar to Edward Cullen, Alice has a supernatural power: she has the ability to predict the future. Her visions change as the people around her make decisions. Additionally, her insights can be limited when it comes to Bella. Alice claims Bella feels like a sister to her. 
 Esme Cullen - A vampire and the wife of Carlisle Cullen. She acts as a mother figure to Alice, Emmett, Rosalie, Jasper, and Edward. She has a caring and warm personality.
 Jasper Cullen - The youngest of the Cullen vampire clan. Jasper has the ability to feel and control the emotions of those around him. Throughout the book, Jasper uses this gift to help Bella feel calm.
 Mike Newton - He is one of Bella's first friends in Forks. A few chapters into the book, he reveals he has a crush on Bella. After Bella lets him down, he asks Jessica to attend the dance with him. He acts jealous when Bella begins dating Edward.
 Jessica Stanley - A girl who is friends with Mike and Angela. She becomes one of Bella's new friends. Jessica can be described as loquacious. When Bella shows interest in the Cullens, Jessica becomes jealous and passive-aggressive.

 James - A vampire with an unusual ability to track people. When the Cullens try to protect Bella, James figures she will be the biggest hunt of his life. 
 Jacob Black - A non-vampire, Quileute who lives on the La Push reservation near Forks. Upon first meeting, Bella is charmed and impressed by Jacob in many ways. Jacob learns that he is similar to Bella in many ways. Her father Charlie sees that Jacob is safe boyfriend material, the kind of guy he would approve of her dating. He later becomes a member of the Quileute wolf pack as he is the direct descendent of the chief. 
 Carlisle Cullen - A handsome, conscientious doctor. As the patriarch of the Cullen clan, Carlisle started the practice of a 'vegetarian' (no human) diet. As a human in the 17th century, Carlisle was the son of an anti-'evil-being' pastor.

Development
Meyer claims that the idea for Twilight came to her in a dream on June 2, 2003. She dreamed of a human girl and a vampire who loved her but still wanted her blood. Inspired by her dream, Meyer wrote the draft of what is now Chapter 13 of the book. The first drafts were titled Forks instead of Twilight; the publisher requested the title change. At first, Meyer didn't name her two main characters. She chose Edward, influenced by Edward Rochester from Charlotte Brontë's Jane Eyre and Edward Ferrars from Jane Austen's Sense and Sensibility. She named the female lead  Isabella, thinking she would have chosen that for a daughter. Rosalie and Jasper were originally named Carol and Ronald.

Meyer continued writing to the end chronologically, not worrying about the backstory. She lettered the chapters instead of numbering them, Chapter 13 being E. The last chapter of the first draft kept getting longer and longer, so she wrote epilogue after epilogue. However, she realized that she wanted to explore many of the events in the backstory and the reasons behind the events in the chapters, so she planned to write a 5-6 chapter backstory. Instead, these turned into 24 chapters by the time she was finished. In a matter of three months she had completed a novel. She has said she was writing for her own enjoyment, never thinking of publishing the work. She finished the manuscript on August 29, 2003.

Her sister liked the book and encouraged Meyer to send the manuscript to literary agencies. Of the 15 letters she wrote, five went unanswered, nine brought rejections, and the last was a positive response from Jodi Reamer of Writers House. Meyer had merely sent out letters to literary agents inquiring if they would be interested in a 130,000-word manuscript about teenage vampires. Luck helped. An inexperienced assistant at Writers House responded to her inquiry, not knowing that young adult books are expected to be about 40,000 to 60,000 words in length. Due to that error, Reamer eventually read Meyer's manuscript and signed her up as a client. During the editing process, a chapter that used to be Chapter 20 was cut out of the manuscript along with Emmett's account of his bear attack and some parts of the epilogue.

Cover
Stephenie Meyer has said the apple on the cover represents the forbidden fruit from the Book of Genesis and Bella and Edward's forbidden love. She uses a quote from Genesis 2:17 at the beginning of the book. It also represents Bella's knowledge of good and evil, and the choices she makes. Meyer says, "It asks if you are going to bite in and discover the frightening possibilities around you or refuse and stay safe in the comfortable world you know." An alternative cover features Kristen Stewart and Robert Pattinson, the actors who play the lead characters in the film adaptation.

Awards and honors
 Among Publishers Weekly's "Best Children's Books of 2005"
 Among School Library Journal's "Best Books of 2005"

Publication
Meyer's inquiry letter was initially rejected by 14 agents. Eight publishers competed for the rights to publish Twilight in the 2003 auction. Little, Brown and Company originally bid for $300,000, but Meyer's agent asked for $1 million; the publishers finally settled on $750,000 for three books. Twilight was published in 2005 with a print run of 75,000 copies. It debuted at #5 on the New York Times Best Seller list within a month of its release, and later peaked at #1. Foreign rights to the novel were sold to over 26 countries.

In October 2008, Twilight was ranked #26 in USA Today's list of "Bestselling Books of Last 15 Years". Later, the book went on to become the best-selling book of 2008. and the second biggest selling of 2009, only behind its sequel New Moon.

For the tenth anniversary of the book's release, Meyer released Life and Death: Twilight Reimagined, alongside the original Twilight. Life and Death is a reimagining of the story with Beau (a male human) and Edythe (a female vampire) as the leads.

On August 4, 2020, Meyer released the Twilight companion piece Midnight Sun. Midnight Sun is the story of Twilight as told from Edward Cullen's perspective.

Critical reception
Publishers Weekly calling Meyer one of the most "promising new authors of 2005". The Times praised the book for capturing "perfectly the teenage feeling of sexual tension and alienation". Hillias J. Martin of School Library Journal addresses the appeal of the novel to be due to its clear and understandable nature, allowing readers to become fully engaged Norah Piehl of TeenReads also wrote, "Twilight is a gripping blend of romance and horror". Publishers Weekly's starred review described Bella's "infatuation with outsider Edward", their risky relationship, and "Edward's inner struggle" as a metaphor for sexual frustration accompanying adolescence. Booklist wrote, "There are some flaws here–a plot that could have been tightened, an over reliance on adjectives and adverbs to bolster dialogue–but this dark romance seeps into the soul." Christopher Middleton of The Daily Telegraph called the book a "high school drama with a bloody twist ... no secret, of course, at whom this book is aimed, and no doubt, either, that it has hit its mark". Jennifer Hawes of The Post and Courier said, "Twilight, the first book in Stephenie Meyer's series, gripped me so fiercely that I called the nearest teenager I know and begged for her copy after I misplaced my own." Roberta Goli of Suite101.com gave the novel a positive review, saying that while "the first half of the novel lacks action", the writing is "fluid" and the story "interesting". She also praised the depth of emotion shown between the main characters for pinpointing "the angst of teenage love." Jana Reiss noted the presence of Mormon themes in the Twilight series, seeing Edward Cullen's struggle against carnal desires as an example of Mormonism's "natural man."

Kirkus gave a more mixed review, noting that, "[Twilight] is far from perfect: Edward's portrayal as monstrous tragic hero is overly Byronic, and Bella's appeal is based on magic rather than character. Nonetheless, the portrayal of dangerous lovers hits the spot; fans of dark romance will find it hard to resist." The New York Times review stated, "The premise of Twilight is attractive and compelling — who hasn't fantasized about unearthly love with a beautiful stranger? — but the book suffers at times from overearnest, amateurish writing. A little more "showing" and a lot less "telling" might have been a good thing, especially some pruning to eliminate the constant references to Edward's shattering beauty and Bella's undying love." Although the Daily Telegraph later listed Twilight at number 32 on its list of "100 books that defined the noughties", it said that the novel was "Astonishing, mainly for the ineptitude of [Meyer's] prose". Elizabeth Hand said in a review for the Washington Post, "Meyer's prose seldom rises above the serviceable, and the plotting is leaden". In addition, the book is voted as the worst book of all time on the website Goodreads.

Book challenges
Twilight was on the American Library Association Top Ten List of the Most Frequently Challenged Books of 2010, for containing a "religious viewpoint" and "violence". The Twilight series was on the same list in 2009 for being "sexually explicit", "unsuited to age group", and having a "religious viewpoint". The Marshall University Libraries pinpoint specific reasons  several schools have removed the novel from libraries, citing the hyper-sexual nature of the novel, as well as the religious controversy within the plot.

Legacy

Sequels
The second book, New Moon, was originally published in the US on August 21, 2006. Eclipse was published on August 7, 2007. The fourth and final novel, Breaking Dawn, is the longest book in the original tetralogy at 756 pages in the US hardcover version, and 700 pages in the US paperback release. It was published worldwide on August 2, 2008, and sold over 1.3 million copies in the first 24 hours of its release in the US.

Furthermore, on June 5, 2010, Meyer published The Short Second Life of Bree Tanner. This book dives into Bree Tanner's experience as a new vampire. Then, on October 6, 2015, she released Life and Death, a retelling of Twilight with reversed gender roles. Most recently, Meyer released Midnight Sun on August 4, 2020, which retells Twilight from Edward Cullen's point of view.

Manga version
A manga-style Japanese language version of the Twilight saga was released in 13 installments. The books, which were primarily text, featured illustrated pages of art sprinkled throughout the book.

Film version

Twilight was adapted as a film by Summit Entertainment. The film was directed by Catherine Hardwicke and stars Kristen Stewart and Robert Pattinson as protagonists Bella and Edward. The screenplay was adapted by Melissa Rosenberg. The movie was released in theaters in the United States on November 21, 2008, and on DVD on March 21, 2009. The DVD was released in Australia on April 22, 2009.

Graphic novel version

On July 15, 2009, Entertainment Weekly confirmed rumors that a graphic novel adaptation of Twilight was in development. The book was drawn by Korean artist Young Kim and published by Yen Press. Stephenie Meyer reviewed every panel herself. According to EW, "it doesn't look simply like an artist's rendering of Kristen Stewart and Rob Pattinson. In fact, the characters seem to be an amalgam of Meyer's literary imagination and the actors' actual looks." EW magazine published finished illustrations of Edward, Bella, and Jacob in their July 17, 2009 issue. The first part of the graphic novel was released on March 16, 2010.

References

External links

 Stephenie Meyer - Official Website
 Official Twilight Saga Website
 The Official Twilight Lexicon
 Twilight at the Hachette Book Group
 Twilight. Mormon Literature & Creative Arts Database.

2005 fantasy novels
2005 American novels
American fantasy novels adapted into films
American vampire novels
Little, Brown and Company books
Novels set in Washington (state)
Paranormal romance novels
Twilight (novel series)
2005 debut novels